The Speaker of the National Assembly presides over the National Assembly of South Africa, the lower house of the Parliament of South Africa. The speaker is chosen from among the Members of the Assembly at its first sitting following a general election and whenever the office is vacant. The Speaker acts as a "referee", taking charge of debates to make sure that the MPs can participate freely while keeping to the rules. The Speaker also has managerial duties to ensure that Parliament runs smoothly.  Each political party in the Assembly elects a chief whip to run its affairs. The presiding officers, the chief whips, and the Leader of Government Business (the person appointed by the Cabinet to liaise with Parliament) together decide on the programme of work.

The office of Speaker of the National Assembly was preceded by the offices of Speaker of the House of Assembly (1910–1984) under the 1909 and 1961 constitutions and Speaker of Parliament under the Tricameral Parliament (1984–1994).

The Speaker
The Speaker of the National Assembly is elected to and removed from office in terms of S52 of the Constitution. In terms of this section the:
House must elect the Speaker from its members during the first House sitting
The house may remove the Speaker by resolution
The house must fill the position when it becomes vacant during term
Chief Justice must preside over the election of the Speaker

The Mandate of the Speaker
The Speaker's mandate is twofold. It is constitutional and institutional. This mandate is furthermore dual at the National Assembly and Parliamentary level. In both situations, it involves interacting with the following sectors of the global community:

International
Continental
Regional
National

List of speakers (1854–present)

Speakers of the Cape House of Assembly (1854–1910)

Speakers of the House of Assembly (1910–1994)

Speakers of the National Assembly (1994–present)

See also
Parliament of the Cape of Good Hope
House of Assembly of South Africa
Tricameral Parliament
National Assembly of South Africa

References

External links
South African ministries, etc – Rulers.org

Legislative speakers in South Africa
Parliament of South Africa